Aleksandr Panfilov (born 11 October 1960) is a retired track cyclist who competed for the USSR at the 1980 Summer Olympics in Moscow, winning a silver medal in the 1 km time trial. Panfilov was only 19 years old at the time. He trained at Armed Forces sports society in Tashkent. At the 1983 Summer Universiade he won the gold medal in the 1 km time trial.

References

External links
 
 1000m Time Trial at Full Olympians

1960 births
Living people
Soviet male cyclists
Cyclists at the 1980 Summer Olympics
Olympic cyclists of the Soviet Union
Olympic silver medalists for the Soviet Union
Olympic medalists in cycling
Sportspeople from Bishkek
Kyrgyzstani male cyclists
Uzbekistani male cyclists
Medalists at the 1980 Summer Olympics
Universiade medalists in cycling
Universiade gold medalists for the Soviet Union
Medalists at the 1983 Summer Universiade